Hard Times may refer to:

Literature 
 Hard Times (novel), an 1854 novel by Charles Dickens
 Hard Times: An Oral History of the Great Depression, a 1970 book by Studs Terkel

Film and television 
 Hard Times (1915 film), a silent British film directed by Thomas Bentley based on Dickens' novel
 Welcome to Hard Times (film), a 1967 American Western film
 Hard Times (1975 film), an American drama starring Charles Bronson
 Hard Times (1988 film) (Tempos Difíceis), a 1988 Portuguese film directed by João Botelho
 Holy Water (film), later re-named Hard Times, a 2009 Irish comedy film
 Hard Times (Canadian TV series), a 1975 Canadian documentary series
 Hard Times (British TV series), a 1977 British series based on Dickens's novel
 "Hard Times", a 2001 episode of Canada: A People's History
 The Hard Times of RJ Berger, a 2010 TV series
 NWA Hard Times (est. 2020), a professional wrestling pay-per-view event

Music

Albums 
 Hard Times (Laughing Hyenas album), 1995
 Hard Times (Peter Skellern album), 1975

Songs 
 "Hard Times Come Again No More", or "Hard Times", an 1854 song by Stephen Foster
 "Hard Times" (James Taylor song), 1981
 "Hard Times" (Lacy J. Dalton song), 1980
 "Hard Times" (Paramore song), 2017
 "Hard Times" (Plan B song), 2011
 "Hard Times" (Run-D.M.C. song), 1980
 "Hard Times", by AC/DC from Rock or Bust
 "Hard Times", by Baby Huey from The Baby Huey Story: The Living Legend
 "Hard Times", by Boz Scaggs from Down Two Then Left
 "Hard Times", by Cro-Mags from The Age of Quarrel
 "Hard Times", by David "Fathead" Newman from Fathead
 "Hard Times", by The Human League from Fascination!
 "Hard Times", by The Jetzons, later re-used in Sonic the Hedgehog 3
 "Hard Times", by Kiss from Dynasty
 "Hard Times", by Living Colour from The Chair in the Doorway
 "Hard Times", by Patrick Wolf from The Bachelor
 "Hard Times", by Ringo Starr from Bad Boy
 "Hard Times (No One Knows Better Than I)", by Ray Charles from The Genius Sings the Blues

Artists 
 The Hard Times (band), a 1960s American folk rock band

Other uses 
 Hard Times Cafe, a restaurant in Minneapolis, Minnesota
 Hard Times Cafe (chain restaurant), a restaurant chain in Virginia, Washington D.C., and Maryland
 Hard Times Plantation, a historic location in Tensas Parish, Louisiana
The Hard Times, a satirical website

See also 
 Hard Time (disambiguation)